"Man on Mir" is a single by the Irish pop rock quintet, Bell X1, and the second from the band's debut album Neither Am I. It was released on 8 September 2000 in Ireland. It entered the Irish Singles Chart on 14 September 2000, spending one week there and peaking at #30, being the first Top 30 hit.

References

External links 
 Bell X1 on irishmusiccentral.com

2000 singles
Bell X1 (band) songs
2000 songs
Island Records singles
Songs written by Brian Crosby (composer)
Songs written by David Geraghty
Songs written by Paul Noonan